Jason Matthew Ethier, more popularly known as ImJayStation or JayStation, is a Canadian Internet personality and former YouTuber.

Career
Ethier began his YouTube career in 2015 as JayStation. In 2016, he was arrested by Ottawa police for trespassing during some of his "24-hour overnight challenges", which showed him allegedly breaking and entering into empty homes, stadiums and office buildings to spend the night. Many of these stunts were staged. His YouTube channel was demonetized following his arrest. On November 24, 2016, Ethier then restarted on YouTube under the channel name "ImJayStation", re-uploading all of his content except the ones related to his trespassing. His channel name was derived from PlayStation, a brand of video game consoles designed by Sony.

Controversies

"Contacting" dead celebrities
Ethier received negative responses within the YouTube community over his attempts to contact dead celebrities such as XXXTentacion and Mac Miller through paranormal activities (notably ouija boards and "spirit boxes") late at night (known as "3 a.m. challenges"). On June 26, 2019, following the death of YouTuber Etika, Ethier uploaded a video using a similar clickbait title as his previous videos. In this video, he apologized for the content of his past ouija board and celebrity death clickbait videos.

Walt Disney World arrest
At around 6:30 p.m. on March 24, 2018, Ethier was arrested at Florida's Walt Disney World on charges of trespassing and resisting arrest. He claimed that he and a fellow YouTuber were in Florida filming haunted vlogs for future content.

Security had been called on Ethier after he became agitated at the fact that his bag had been accidentally taken by another guest at the park. According to staff, Ethier became agitated and refused to check the lost and found or guest claims to ascertain where his items were, instead opting to berate the managers. He was asked to leave the baggage check while filming his experience, which is against WDW rules to protect the privacy of other guests, and was subsequently jailed on a $1,200 bond.

On Twitter and YouTube, Ethier called for his followers to boycott Disney World, threatened legal action against Disney, claiming the camera stolen by Disney security guards and the Orlando Police Department, the latter of which has no jurisdiction over Disney property.

Assault and fake death of girlfriend
In January 2020, Ethier announced to his audience that his girlfriend at the time, fellow YouTuber Alexia Marano, had been killed by a drunk driver in Toronto, Canada. Subsequent videos—originally presented as genuine by Ethier—show him visiting a makeshift memorial and attempting to contact her from the grave via a ouija board. Due to the nature of the claims made by Ethier in other videos in the past (such as claiming to have bought children and slaves off of the dark web, summoned dead animals, and become decapitated using a voodoo doll), some viewers and fellow YouTubers were suspicious of the claims.

After Mutahar Anas, the host of the SomeOrdinaryGamers channel on YouTube, had contacted the Toronto and Ottawa Police Services to confirm that Marano was still alive at the time, Ethier admitted that the news of her death was a hoax that was intended to increase his subscriber and viewer counts, and that he had planned to "resurrect" her in a later video. Marano ended her relationship with Ethier after the controversy and has since deleted her YouTube channel.

In a video posted on January 26, 2020, Ethier made the claim that Marano had been in on the scam from the beginning. He also claimed that she had left him and took her belongings with her, and that police arrived at his home to notify him that she had accused him of assault, as well as assault with a weapon. Marano said on Twitter that she was "just a little girl caught in the crossfire." Toronto Police confirmed that a warrant for Ethier's arrest was issued on February 3, that he had been arrested and charged, and that he would appear in court on March 16 in Toronto's Old City Hall on charges of assault and assault with a weapon. It is unclear if the charges relate to the hoax.

Second channel and termination from YouTube
On February 25, 2020, following the demonetization of his videos by YouTube and criticism from the YouTube community for his death prank video, Ethier apologized for his past errors and announced his departure from the platform in a 13-minute-long video uploaded to his main channel called "Goodbye...". In the video, Ethier detailed his regrets from his YouTube career, from his paranormal vlogs faking communication with dead celebrities to his homophobic videos in which he drinks a "gay potion". YouTube also confirmed to Insider that Ethier's channel had been demonetized one week before Ethier quit his channel, meaning that he could no longer derive income from his YouTube videos.

However, two months later, Ethier returned to YouTube in a video with his former girlfriend Marano on their joint channel Dream Team, the two claiming to have resolved their differences. Later in the year, the Dream Team channel was wiped off of all its content except for one video due to Marano breaking up with Ethier again. Ethier took over the account and restructured it into his second channel, titled "666", in which he mostly released reaction and gameplay content.

On March 12, 2021, his channel ImJayStation along with 666 were terminated, the given reason being for violating YouTube's Terms of Service. Ethier initially assumed the terminations were a mistake and contacted YouTube to ask to reinstate them. YouTube responded in an email the reasons for his termination. This led to him calling it the "worst platform ever". He claimed on his Twitter account that he "did nothing wrong", and that his channels were wrongfully terminated. Ethier threatened to sue YouTube over their decision and has continued to evade his termination with the creation of new channels.

References

Canadian YouTubers
Living people
People from Ottawa
People from Nova Scotia
Male bloggers
Video bloggers
YouTube controversies
Vlogs-related YouTube channels
YouTube channels closed in 2021
YouTube channels launched in 2015
Year of birth missing (living people)
People charged with assault